Saint-Aubin-sur-Aire (literally "Saint Albin on Aire") is a commune in the Meuse department in Grand Est in north-eastern France. The 18th-century French historian, diplomat and Encyclopédiste Jean-Baptiste Luton Durival (1725–1810) was born in Saint-Aubin-sur-Aire.

See also
Communes of the Meuse department

References

Saintaubinsuraire